Ev is a given name, often a short form (hypocorism) of Everett or Evan. It may refer to:

 Everett Ev Faunce (1926–2009), American football player and college head coach
 Evelyn Ev Miller (born 1952), New Zealand former cricketer
 Everett Rogers (1931–2004), American communication theorist and sociologist
 Everett Ev Rowan (1902–1956), American football player
 Everett Sharp (1918–1996), American football player
 Evan Williams (Internet entrepreneur) (born 1972), founder of Twitter

Hypocorisms